Akram El Hadi Saleem (born 27 February 1987) is a Sudanese international footballer who plays for Al-Naser SC (Omdurman), as a goalkeeper. He was the starting goalkeeper for the Sudan team at the 2012 African Cup of Nations and took part in 3 matches.

Honours

Clubs
 Al-Hilal Club
Sudan Premier League
Champions (2):2005, 2006
Al-Merrikh SC
Sudan Premier League
Champions (2): 2008, 2013
Sudan Cup
Winners (3): 2008, 2012, 2013

National
Sudan National Football Team
CECAFA Cup
Champions (1): 2007

References

1987 births
Living people
Sudanese footballers
Sudan international footballers
2008 Africa Cup of Nations players
2012 Africa Cup of Nations players
Al-Merrikh SC players
Al Khartoum SC players
Association football goalkeepers
Sudan Premier League players
El Hilal SC El Obeid players
Sudan A' international footballers
2018 African Nations Championship players